Radja is an Indian surname. Notable people with the surname include:

Kinga Rajda (born 2000), Polish female ski jumper
Mulraj Rajda (1931–2012), Indian writer, actor, and director
Sameer Rajda (born 1963), Indian actor
Ratansingh Rajda, Indian politician

Indian surnames